The Bangladesh Bureau of Statistics (BBS) is the centralized official bureau in Bangladesh for collecting statistics on demographics, the economy, and other facts about the country and disseminating the information.

History 
Although independent statistical programs had existed in the country before, they were often incomplete or produced inaccurate results, which led the Government of Bangladesh establishing an official bureau in August 1974, by merging four of the previous larger statistical agencies, the Bureau of Statistics, the Bureau of Agriculture Statistics, the Agriculture Census Commission and the Population Census Commission. 

In July 1975, the Statistics and Informatics Division was created under the Planning Ministry (Bangladesh) and tasked to oversee the BBS. Between 2002 and 2012, the division remained abolished but was later reinstated.

The Bangladesh Bureau of Statistics is headquartered in Dhaka. As of 2019, it has 8 Divisional statistical offices, 64 District statistical offices and 489 Upazila/Thana offices.

References

External links
 Bangladesh Bureau of Statistics, "Census Reports: Population Census-2001", 2001. The 1991 census figures can be seen compared to the 2001 census.

National statistical services
Demographics of Bangladesh
Government agencies of Bangladesh
Research institutes in Bangladesh
1974 establishments in Bangladesh
Organisations based in Dhaka